Eugene Asbury "Cap" Maynor (August 27, 1893 – July 25, 1983) was American football, basketball, baseball, and wrestling coach.  He served as the head football coach at Northwest Missouri State Teacher's College—now known as Northwest Missouri State University—in Maryville, Missouri in 1922 and Western State College of Colorado—now known as Western Colorado University—in Gunnison, Colorado from 1925 to 1926.

Head coaching record

Football

References

External links
 

1893 births
1983 deaths
Basketball coaches from Alabama
Northwest Missouri State Bearcats football coaches
Northwest Missouri State Bearcats men's basketball coaches
Northwestern Wildcats baseball coaches
Western Colorado Mountaineers athletic directors
Western Colorado Mountaineers football coaches
College wrestling coaches in the United States
People from Blount County, Alabama